Howard James Twilley Jr. (born December 25, 1943) is a former American football player. He played college football at the University of Tulsa and was the runner up for the Heisman Trophy in 1965. Twilley played professionally as a wide receiver with the Miami Dolphins of the American Football League (AFL) and the National Football League (NFL) from 1966 to 1976. He and tackle Norm Evans were the only two players  on the original 1966 Dolphins squad to play on the 1972 Dolphins team that had the NFL's only perfect season and won Super Bowl VII.

During his 1965 season at Tulsa, Twilley set NCAA records for the most receiving yards in a season (1,779), a record that stood until broken by Nevada's Alex Van Dyke in 1995, and for the most receptions in a season (134), which stood until broken by Houston's Manny Hazard in 1989.  In 1992 Twilley  was inducted into the College Football Hall of Fame.  He finished his three seasons at Tulsa with 261 receptions for 3,334 yards and 32 touchdowns, and was enshrined in the school's athletic hall of fame in 1984.

Twilley finished his NFL career with 212 receptions for 3,064 yards and 23 touchdowns. He also caught a 28-yard touchdown pass in the Dolphins' Super Bowl VII win over the Washington Redskins.

After Twilley's football career ended, he pursued a career in business. He owned 28 The Athlete's Foot sporting goods stores before selling them in 1990, and worked in an investment firm. In 1994, he actively considered a run for the United States House of Representatives to succeed Jim Inhofe in Oklahoma's 1st congressional district when Inhofe decided to run for the United States Senate but he ultimately decided to support the candidacy of another conservative Republican former NFL star, Steve Largent. He was inducted into the Oklahoma Sports Hall of Fame in 1995.

See also
 List of NCAA major college football yearly scoring leaders

References

External links
 

1943 births
Living people
American football wide receivers
Miami Dolphins players
Tulsa Golden Hurricane football players
All-American college football players
College Football Hall of Fame inductees
Players of American football from Houston
American Football League players